Alena Havrlíková (born 13 June 1977) is a Czech former professional tennis player.

Havrlíková, a European No. 1 in junior tennis, played on the professional tour during the 1990s and had a career-high singles ranking of 298 in the world, winning two ITF titles. Her only WTA Tour singles main draw appearance came as a wildcard at the 1993 Prague Open, where she lost in the first round to Inés Gorrochategui.

ITF finals

Singles: 3 (2–1)

Doubles: 4 (1–3)

References

External links
 
 

1977 births
Living people
Czech female tennis players
Czechoslovak female tennis players